Muricococcum is a genus of plant of the family Euphorbiaceae first described as a genus in 1956. It contains only one known species, Muricococcum sinense, native to southern China (Guangxi, Yunnan) and northern Vietnam.

The species is listed as vulnerable.

References

Epiprineae
Flora of Asia
Monotypic Euphorbiaceae genera
Vulnerable plants